The Planèze of Saint-Flour is a French volcanic plateau, belonging to the Cantal Mounts. It is a traditional area of the Auvergne region.

Originally, the name "Planèze" refers specifically to the Cantal Mounts region. The term was then taken over by geographers to characterise the basaltic plateaus from volcanic eruptions.

Location

The basaltic plateau is the eastern part of the Cantal Mountains. It is delimited by the Alagnon, Truyère, Lagnon and valley of Epi.

There is a distinction between the Upper Planèze (or “Mountain”) and the Lower Planèze (or “real Planèze”). The first one is located at over 1100 meters in altitude and joins practically the summits of the Cantal Mounts. It lies to the west of a line passing through the villages of Paulhac, Valuéjols and Ussel.

The real Planèze of Saint-Flour is located to the east of this line and of the Carladès area. It contains two isolated summits of a few tens of meters high that can be seen on the right-hand of the road, going from Saint-Flour to Les Ternes: first the Puech of Frayssinet (1048 meters) with an old chapel and a hamlet, and the two mounds of Tanavelle (1051 meters and 1092 meters), one of which has a village with its Romanesque church.

Municipalities of the Planèze

Geology

7 Million years ago, the Cantal Volcano ended its activity. The Caldera of the Volcano collapsed gradually. A new volcano appeared; the caldera filled up and overflew. The lava first very acidic became basaltic and spread over large fluid lava flows which covered the structure’ slopes. It is the Planezes.

Fauna and Flora

The relief of the Planeze was very little marked; the human has created many pine groves which enable livestock to protect them in case of bad weather. These spaces accommodate many birds’ species such as Fieldfare, Carrion Crow, Common Wood Pigeon, Common Kestrel, Long-eared Owl, Common Chaffinch, Blue Tit, Song Thrush or else Robin.

History

A large number of megaliths confirm a significant prehistoric settlement in Allanche, Joursac, Coltines, Valuéjols, Paulhac, Villedieu, Seriers, and Les Ternes.
Before the foundation of Saint-Flour in the 11th century on the Indiciat’s rock, the capital city of the Planèze was Valuejols which has a Gallic origin.
Several Gallo-Roman sites have been discovered, in particular a villa in the Puech de Frayssinet in which Alphonse Vinatié has made a dig in 1980.
The Planèze was a land in the time of the Gallo-Roman and a territory under the Merovingian. At the Carolingian period, it takes the status of a Viguerie. It was close to the Viguerie Carlat which later became the Viscount of Carladès.

Human Activities

The Planeze has been one of the vast areas of farming in Auvergne with the Limagne and the Deves. We grew cereals and legumes, in particular lentils. Today this area is reserved for the pasture and the bovine farming. However it keeps its agricultural potentiality thanks to a very productive ground.

Monuments and architecture

The traditional architecture is composed of churches, houses and castles of Upper-Auvergne. Amongst them :

The Cross of Lescure near Valuéjols
The Church and the Castle of Œuillet in Ussel
The Churches of Laveissenet and of Valuéjols
The Castle of La Boyle in Brezons
The Castle of Bélinay in Paulhac
The Castle of Bracou, in Paulhac
The Castle of Chambon, in Paulhac
The site of the Castle of Turlande, in Paulhenc
The Castle of Rochebrune in Oradour
The Castle of Les Ternes in Les Ternes

Notes and references
1.↑ Construits en contrebas sur une villa romaine fouillée en 1908 et 1980.

2.↑ Auvergne Velay, Guide Bleu, Montmarqué.

3.↑ Frédéric Surmely, Guide des mégalithes d'Auvergne, p. 43.

4.↑ Albert Dauzat, "Toponymie de l'Auvergne", in Toponymie française.

External links
 :fr:Portail:Cantal
 :fr:Portail:Massif central
 :fr:Portail:Occitanie

Massif Central